Hijab is a veil worn by Muslim women.

Hijab or Hidjab may also refer to:

Religion
 Hijab, is a concept in Sufism.
 Types of hijab, are styles of dress.
 Hijab by country, is an Islamic style of dress by country.
 World Hijab Day, is an event to encourage women to wear the hijab.

People
 Hijab Imtiaz Ali, is an Indian writer, editor and diarist.
 Riyad Farid Hijab, is a Syrian politician.